The Cry of Reason: Beyers Naude – An Afrikaner Speaks Out is a 1988 American documentary film directed by Robert Bilheimer. It was nominated for an Academy Award for Best Documentary Feature.

References

External links

The Cry of Reason: Beyers Naude - An Afrikaner Speaks Out at Worldwide Documentaries Inc.

1988 films
1988 documentary films
American documentary films
Films directed by Robert Bilheimer
Documentary films about apartheid
1980s English-language films
1980s American films